Probin Deka (1 October 1943) is an Indian politician. He was elected to the Lok Sabha, the lower house of the Indian Parliament, from the Mangaldoi constituency of Assam in 1991 and is a member of the 
Indian National Congress.

References

External links
  Official biographical sketch in the Lok Sabha website

1943 births
Indian National Congress politicians
Living people
India MPs 1991–1996
Lok Sabha members from Assam
People from Darrang district
Indian National Congress politicians from Assam